Douglas Samuel Jones,  (born 3 October 1949) is an independent international arbitrator based in London, Sydney and Toronto. He is a door tenant at Atkin Chambers, London, a member of Sydney Arbitration Chambers, and a member of Toronto Arbitration Chambers in Toronto, Canada. He serves as an International Judge of the Singapore International Commercial Court.

Early life and education
Born in 1949, Jones was educated at Normanhurst Boys' High School, Southport State High School and the University of Queensland in Australia. He graduated from the University of Queensland with a combined Bachelor of Arts and Bachelor of Laws degree in 1974, followed by a Master of Laws in 1977.

Career
Jones began his legal career in 1969 in Brisbane as an articled clerk at Morris Fletcher & Cross, (which later became part of MinterEllison). In 1976 he was appointed a partner of Morris Fletcher & Cross and head of its National Construction & Engineering group, a position that he continued to hold when he left Brisbane in 1989 to set up the firm's Sydney office.

In 1993, Jones joined the Sydney office of Clayton Utz as a partner and national head of the firm's Construction group. In 1995 he became head of International Arbitration and Private International Law group, and in 2000 became head of the firm's National Major Projects group.  He has previously been a member of the Clayton Utz Board (2002–2006), and served as a partner until 2014, when he retired to become a full time international arbitrator. He served as a part time consultant to Clayton Utz from 2015–2019 until establishing independent chambers in Sydney in 2019.

Jones has held appointments to a number of professional bodies. Among others, he is: Immediate Past President of the International Academy of Construction Lawyers (2018–2020), Past President of the Australian Centre for International Commercial Arbitration (ACICA) (2008–2014); Companion, Chartered Arbitrator, and Past President of the Chartered Institute of Arbitrators (CIArb) (2011); Fellow of both the Resolution Institute (formerly The Institute of Arbitrators and Mediators Australia) and the Arbitrators and Mediators Institute of New Zealand (AMINZ); and Past President of the Dispute Resolution Board Australasia Inc (DRBA). Jones also holds professorial appointments at the Queen Mary University of London and the University of Melbourne.

Jones has served as arbitrator in both ad hoc and institutional commercial arbitrations under institutional rules of the American Arbitration Association (AAA), International Centre for Dispute Resolution (ICDR), Resolution Institute (formerly The Institute of Arbitrators and Mediators Australia), Australian Centre for International Commercial Arbitration (ACICA), Dubai International Arbitration Centre (DIAC), Hong Kong International Arbitration Centre (HKIAC), International Chamber of Commerce (ICC), Asian International Arbitration Centre (AIAC),  London Court of International Arbitration (LCIA), Singapore International Arbitration Centre (SIAC), Korean Commercial Arbitration Board (KCAB),  Cairo Regional Centre for International Commercial Arbitration (CRCICA), Vietnam International Arbitration Center (VIAC), Arbitration Institute of the Stockholm Chamber of Commerce (SCC), and European Development Fund Arbitration and Conciliation Rules as well as UNCITRAL Rules, in disputes of values exceeding some billions $US. In 2010 Jones was appointed as an Australian Government nominee on the International Centre for Settlement of Investment Disputes (ICSID) Panel of Arbitrators, and was re-appointed to this role in 2017.

Jones is acknowledged as a leading arbitrator being ranked in a number of leading directories. In 2020, Doug received the Global Arbitration Review award for Best Prepared and Most Responsive Arbitrator. In the same year, he maintained his Band One ranking in the Chambers Asia-Pacific international arbitration category for a tenth consecutive year. Chambers Asia-Pacific has recognised Doug as "without question the leading Asia-Pacific-based arbitrator for construction disputes" and testified that “[h]e is regarded by many as 'the leading construction arbitrator in the world'”.

On 10 October 2019, Doug was appointed as an International Judge of the Singapore International Commercial Court.

In October 2020, Doug was elected as an Honorary Bencher of the Honourable Society of Gray's Inn.

Publications
Jones is the author of Building and Construction Claims and Disputes (Construction Publications, 1996) and Commercial Arbitration in Australia (2nd ed, Thomson Reuters, 2013). He is the co-editor-in-chief of the International Construction Law Review, and has also published numerous articles and book chapters on construction law and dispute resolution. He regularly contributes to a range of industry journals and publications.

Honours
In January 1999, Jones was appointed a Member of the Order of Australia for "service to the law, particularly in the field of construction law, and to the development of arbitration and alternative dispute resolution methods".

In June 2012 he was appointed an Officer of the Order of Australia for "distinguished service to the law as a leader in the areas of arbitration and alternative dispute resolution, to policy reform, and to national and international professional organisations".

In August 2014, he was awarded the Michael Kirby Lifetime Achievement Award at the 2014 Lawyers Weekly Law Awards. In presenting the award, the editor of Lawyers Weekly said:"Doug has left a lasting legacy not just on the Australian legal profession, but the international legal community. No one in the Australian legal sector has done more to promote Australia as a viable destination to hear international commercial arbitration matters than Doug. His tireless energy and devotion in promoting Alternative Dispute Resolution here and abroad has ensured Australia has a credible international voice in major discussions and developments on the global commercial dispute resolution scene"

In June 2016, he was appointed Companion of the Chartered Institute of Arbitrators in recognition of his achievements in private dispute resolution and his substantial contributions to the Chartered Institute by promoting its objectives worldwide. He is one of only five people bestowed with this honour.

In May 2018, Jones was awarded the John Shaw Medal, by Roads Australia for his contribution to the Australian roads industry. He is the only lawyer to receive this accolade.

In July 2020, he was recognised as 'Best Prepared and Most Responsive Arbitrator' at the GAR Awards 2020.

Personal life
He is married to Canadian scholar, author and international arbitrator, Janet Walker.

References

1949 births
20th-century Australian lawyers
Living people
Officers of the Order of Australia
Place of birth unknown
21st-century Australian judges